Councils of the Roman Catholic Church were held at Aix-en-Provence in 1112, 1374, 1409, 1585, 1612, 1838,(fr) and 1850. In that of 1612 the Gallican work of Edmond Richer, De la puissance ecclésiastique et politique (Paris, 1611), was censured. 

In that of 1838 the Fathers requested Pope Gregory XVI to add "Immaculate" to the word "Conception" in the preface of the Mass for the Feast of the Immaculate Conception, which he did.

Catholic Church councils held in France
12th-century Catholic Church councils
14th-century Catholic Church councils
15th-century Catholic Church councils
16th-century Catholic Church councils
17th-century Catholic Church councils
19th-century Catholic Church councils
1838 in Christianity
1850 in Christianity
1850 conferences
1838 conferences